Nathan Phillips (born February 22, 1954), also known as Sky Man, is an Omaha Native American political activist known for his role in the January 2019 Lincoln Memorial confrontation in Washington, D.C.

Early life
Phillips was born in Lincoln, Nebraska, where he spent his first five years in a traditional Omaha Nation tribal home. From about the age of five, when he was separated from his mother, he was raised in a white foster family. He went to Lincoln Southeast High School. He later moved to Washington, D.C.

Phillips entered the U.S. Marine Corps Reserves on May 20, 1972. During his time in the military, he was trained as an anti-tank missileman and then served on active duty as a refrigerator technician in Nebraska and California; he was shown as absent without leave three times. He was not deployed to Vietnam or anywhere overseas. On May 5, 1976, Phillips was discharged as an E-1 private following disciplinary issues.

Activism 

At the end of the 20th century, Phillips was working to create a foster care system run by American Indians for American Indian children to help them gain an appreciation for their heritage: "I don't want our children to think that prison is the only place for them to go."

The New York Times identified Phillips as a former director of the Native Youth Alliance, a group aiming to uphold traditional culture and spiritual ways for future Native Americans, and reported that he leads an annual ceremony honoring Native American war veterans in Arlington National Cemetery.

The Guardian called him "a well-known Native American activist who was among those leading the Standing Rock protests in 2016 and 2017 against the construction of an oil pipeline in North Dakota". Phillips was among the last of the protesters when law enforcement evicted the camps and effectively ended the protests, which for his part were "a prayer (...) a commitment to stand for our youth, for our children, for nature and for myself, standing for my nation."

In 2015 Phillips alleged a group of students from Eastern Michigan University harassed him. A January 2019 article in The Washington Post described Phillips as a "a veteran in the indigenous rights movement".

A January 2019 article in Indian Country Today described Phillips as a "keeper of a sacred pipe".

Between Earth and Sky

Phillips is the subject of the award-winning 2013 documentary film Between Earth and Sky in which he and his wife, Shoshana, travel back to his Omaha reservation after his wife was diagnosed with bone-marrow cancer. Together they seek traditional healing for her. She died of the disease in 2014.

"Make It Bun Dem" video 
In 2012, Phillips and his son appeared in the music video for "Make It Bun Dem", a song by Skrillex and Damian "Jr. Gong" Marley. In a February 20, 2017, interview that took place during the Dakota Access Pipeline protests (DAPL), Phillips explained he had answered the casting call because he wanted to help his children cope with his wife's cancer.

Lincoln Memorial confrontation

On January 18, 2019, snippets of videos recorded at the Lincoln Memorial in Washington, D.C., appeared to show Phillips being harassed by a group of 50 to 60 high school boys who had attended the coinciding annual March for Life; they were widely shared through social media. Print media described Phillips as surrounded by the students, one of whom, Nicholas Sandmann, exhibited a "relentless smirk". Phillips had walked towards and into a group of adolescent boys from Covington Catholic High School (CovCath), who had traveled from Kentucky on a school trip to attend the anti-abortion March for Life. He began to chant the AIM Song, a traditional Native American inter-tribal powwow song. Videos showed Sandmann, later identified as a junior at CovCath, and Phillips facing each other inches apart while Phillips chanted and beat his drum and some of the students in the background allegedly did "Tomahawk chops" and danced. Several students wore red "Make America Great Again" caps.

Shortly after the video went viral, CovCath's communications director released a statement regretting that the incident took place. On January 19, 2019, multiple students who were present at the incident stated that coverage of the incident had been skewed. Sandmann released a statement saying that the students were confronted by four members of the Black Hebrew Israelites, that Phillips tried to provoke the students, and denying that they had chanted "build the wall" or used any racist language or gestures. Interviewed after the event, Phillips said, "While I was there singing, I heard them saying 'Build that wall! Build that wall!', you know... this is indigenous land! ...We're not supposed to have walls here, we never did—for millennium. Before anybody else came here we never had walls. We never had a prison. We always took care of our elders, we took care of our children," and "There was that moment when I realized I've put myself between beast and prey, [t]hese young men were beastly and these old black individuals was their prey." 

Robby Soave, writing for Reason magazine, and Caitlin Flanagan, writing in The Atlantic, have said that in their opinion, videos of the event either contradicted or failed to confirm parts of Phillips' version of events and the video evidence, while it did not completely exonerate  the boys' behavior, was broadly consistent with their story. Flanagan also said that video footage showed members of the Black Hebrew Israelites shouting racial insults and slurs at a group of Native Americans and later at the students. Asked why he had approached the group of students, Phillips said that he was trying to defuse a confrontation between the group of students and a small group of Black Hebrew Israelites who were shouting insults and profanities at the students. In subsequent interviews, Phillips and his associates stated they interpreted the cheers that the students' directed toward their nearby Indigenous Peoples March as racist.

Notes

References

External links
 
Did Nathan Phillips Falsely Claim He Was a Vietnam Veteran? on Snopes
Native elders recount the history of the song Nathan Phillips sang, the AIM Song on ICT

20th-century Native Americans
21st-century Native Americans
Native American activists
Native Americans' rights activists
Omaha (Native American) people
People from Lincoln, Nebraska
Activists from Nebraska
Military personnel from Nebraska
United States Marine Corps reservists
1954 births
American adoptees
Living people
Articles containing video clips